MGGA may refer to:
 Mannosylglucosyl-3-phosphoglycerate synthase, an enzyme
 Gallium(III) oxide 
 Minnesota Grape Growers Association
 Malta Girl Guides Association
 Maldives Girl Guide Association